Umar Aliyevich Dzhabrailov (born 28 June 1958, Grozny, USSR) is a Russian politician and advisor to Sergei Prikhodko, the Assistant to the President of Russia, He also is the vice president of the Artists Union of Russia, a member of the Russian delegation to the Parliamentary Assembly of the Council of Europe and was the representative to the Federation Council of Russia from the executive body of the Chechen Republic (2004–2009).  He is an ethnic Chechen.

Biography 
From 1973 to 1977, Dzhabrailov studied in the Rospotrebsoyuz College in Moscow. From 1977 to 1979, served in the Soviet Army in the Strategic Missile Forces in Korosten in Ukraine, holding the rank of Captain. In 1985, Dzhabrailov graduated with honors from the Moscow State Institute of International Relations (MGIMO) of the Ministry of Foreign Affairs. In 1989, he became general director of LLP "Danako". In the mid 1990s, he was involved in the killing of his American business partner, Paul Tatum; the killing was because of a series of disagreements over the Radisson Hotel.

In 2001, he was appointed Chairman of the Board of Directors of First Mutual Credit Society Bank. From 2001 to 2004, he was a President of the "Group Plaza”. From 2004 to 2009, he was a senator of the from the Chechen Republic.

Personal life 
Dzhabrailov is often associated with famous Italian and Russian designers and artists, including Roberto Cavalli, Aldo Rota, and well acquainted with Zurab Tsereteli. With Roberto Cavalli. he opened the restaurant Just Cavalli on the site of the restaurant Prague. Dzhabrailov is a collector of works of art, including paintings by Russian artists. and has often supported the arts. Since 2010 he has been actively involved in the Moscow Forum of Culture.

He has two daughters from his first marriage. He is currently married to a Russian musician. Dzhabrailov is fluent in English, German and Italian and understands French, Spanish and Czech. He holds a diploma of the Federation Council. He is an academician at the Russian Academy of Natural Sciences.

Notes

External links 
 Information on the website of the Federation Council

1958 births
Living people
Chechen politicians
Russian people of Chechen descent
Dzhabrailov
Members of the Federation Council of Russia (after 2000)